Gunnar Norebø (born 28 January 1976) is a Norwegian retired football midfielder.

He is from Austrheim. He was regarded as a fine talent in his early days and trained with AFC Ajax. He made his debut for the Norwegian Premier League team SK Brann in 1993, and played there until 1998. He spent some time on loan at VPS Vaasa in his last year at Brann. Released by Brann, in early 1999, he negotiated a contract with the Greek team Ionikos, but contract irregularities led to Norebø dropping the club. He instead joined Åsane. At the same time, he studied at the Norwegian School of Sport Sciences and, in August 2004, he was hired by Norsk Folkehjelp for a project in Eritrea. His job was to play, coach and develop players in the first-tier football club Tesfa FC. He returned to Åsane after one year.

In 2006, he was hired by Lørenskog IF as a playing assistant coach. He still played there in 2008.

References

Norwegian footballers
SK Brann players
Vaasan Palloseura players
Åsane Fotball players
Norwegian expatriate footballers
Expatriate footballers in Finland
Expatriate footballers in Eritrea
Norwegian expatriate sportspeople in Finland
Norwegian expatriate sportspeople in Eritrea
People from Hordaland
Norwegian School of Sport Sciences alumni
1976 births
Living people
Eliteserien players
Veikkausliiga players
Association football midfielders
Sportspeople from Vestland